Standings and results for Group 6 of the UEFA Euro 1996 qualifying tournament.

Standings

Matches

Goalscorers

References

A. Yelagin - History of European Championships 1960-2000 (Terra-Sport, Moscow, 2002) - attendance information

Group 6
1994–95 in Republic of Ireland association football
1995–96 in Republic of Ireland association football
1994–95 in Northern Ireland association football
1995–96 in Northern Ireland association football
1994–95 in Portuguese football
1995–96 in Portuguese football
Portugal at UEFA Euro 1996
1994–95 in Austrian football
1995–96 in Austrian football
1994 in Latvian football
1995 in Latvian football
1994 in Liechtenstein sport
1995 in Liechtenstein sport
1993–94 in Northern Ireland association football
1993–94 in Liechtenstein football
1994–95 in Liechtenstein football
1995–96 in Liechtenstein football